The Magnificent Lie (Swedish: Den underbara lögnen) is a 1955 Swedish drama film directed by Mike Road and starring Signe Hasso, William Langford, Road and Stig Olin. It was shot at the Centrumateljéerna Studios in Stockholm. The film's sets were designed by the art director Arthur Spjuth. It is based on the 1831 short story La Grande Bretèche by Honoré de Balzac and a further short story by Guy de Maupassant. Hasso produced the film, having recently return from a Hollywood, and cast her husband Langford opposite her.

Synopsis
On the night before her wedding a young prospective bride opens a book of short stories and witnesses two nineteenth century tales of love and tragedy.

Cast
 Signe Hasso as 	Joséphine de Merret
 William Langford as	Count Louis de Merret
 Ragnar Arvedson as 	Innkeeper
 Sven Arvor as 	Waiter
 Ann Bibby as 	Innkeeper's Wife
 John Botvid as	Old Man
 Ruth Brady as 	Agnes' Cousin
 Tor Isedal as 	Policeman
 Lillebil Kjellén as 	Gertrud	
 Stig Olin as 	Goronflot
 Hjördis Petterson as 	Aunt Emilie
 Mike Road as 	Edmond
 Naima Wifstrand as Gertrud (50 years later)

References

Bibliography 
 Hannsberry, Karen Burroughs. Femme Noir: Bad Girls of Film. McFarland, 2012.
 Krawc, Alfred. International Directory of Cinematographers, Set- and Costume Designers in Film: Denmark, Finland, Norway, Sweden (from the beginnings to 1984). Saur, 1986.

External links 
 

1955 films
1955 drama films
1950s Swedish-language films
Swedish historical drama films
1950s historical drama films
Films set in the 19th century
Swedish black-and-white films
Films based on works by Honoré de Balzac
Films based on works by Guy de Maupassant
1950s Swedish films